Hiren Gohain (born 1939) is a scholar, writer, literary critic, and social scientist from the Indian state of Assam.

Academic life 
Gohain studied in Cotton College, and did his graduation from Presidency College, Calcutta and then moved to Delhi University to pursue his post-graduation in English literature. After completion of his master's degree, for some time, he became a lecturer in Kirori Mal College of Delhi University. Later, he went to the Cambridge University for doctoral research on the topic 'Paradise Lost and the 17th Century Crisis' later published as 'Tradition and Paradise Lost: A Heretical View', a work highly acclaimed for its original research and fresh perspective. After coming back from Cambridge, he became a professor at the Department of English in Gauhati University.

Contributions as a literary critic
It was Gohain who for the first time brought the ideas and methods of Anglo-American New Criticism to the study of Assamese/Indian literature in Assamese. While studying in Cambridge, he had an eclectic radical ideology but later on, after his return to India, he became a Marxist. It was he who adapted the ideas of critics like György Lukács, Antonio Gramsci, and other critics into the nascent field of Assamese literary criticism. Some of his books in Assamese are Sahityar Satya, Sahitya Aru Chetana, Biswayatan, Asomiya Jatiya Jibanat Mahapurushiya Paramapara, Assam: A Burning Question and several other significant and widely read books. He has also written 4 volumes of memoirs which are also relevant for their incorporation of social and historical content. He is a contributor to journals such as Economic and Political Weekly, Frontier, and occasional publications of institutions like Indian Institute of Advanced Studies (IIAS), Centre for English and Foreign Languages (CIEFL), Shillong. He also is a columnist for various regional and national newspapers.

Other contributions
He is also a regular contributor to Economic and Political Weekly. His book 'Assam A Burning Question' is a compilation of several essays on the socio-political crisis confronting Assam in the context of Assam Movement written in the mid-1980s, and the period dominated by extremism. Recently, he played an important role in the mediation of peace talks between the Government of India and the Assamese insurgent group ULFA. He was the founder president of the Asomiya Sahitya Sanmilani.He is a recipient of Sahitya Aademy award for his book on Sankardev.

Selected published works & journals
 Tradition & Paradise lost: a heretical view (1997, English)
 Assam, a burning question (1984, English) 
 On the present movement in Assam (1980, English)
 Bodo Stir in Perspective
 Nature and art in Shakespeare: an essay on Hamlet (English)
 Sahityar Satya (1970, Assamese)
 Bastabar Swapna (1972, Assamese)
 Kal Bhramar (1974, Assamese)
 Kewal Manuhar Ase Gaan (1970, Assamese)
 Samaj Aru Samalochana (1972, Assamese)
 Sristi Aru Jukti (1972, Assamese)
 Sahitya Aru Chetana (1976, Assamese)
 Kirtan Puthir Roh Bisar (1981, Assamese)
 Tejar Aakhare Likha (1982, Assamese)
 Biswayatan (1983, Assamese)
 Kabitar Bichar Aru Natun Samalochana (1986, Assamese)
 Asamiya Jatiya Jibanat Mahaapurusiya Parampara (1987, Assamese)
 Upanyasar Adhunik Samalochana (Vol. 1 & 2, Assamese)
 Adristwa Aru Asam (1988, Assamese)
 Kalasrot Aru Kandari (1995, Assamese)
 Nature and Art in Shakespeare (1988, English)
 The Magic Plant (1992, English)
 Aspects of Early 19th Century Bengalee Culture (1990, English) 23. Struggling in a time warp (2019, English)
 On Saffronisation of Education

Awards and honors 
 Sahitya Akademi Award in 1989

Political and National activism
Gohain has been a voice of Assam as critic of Assamese national extremism, Hindutva extremism and socio-political issues.

Gohain opposed the citizenship (Amendment) Act and equated the exclusion of Muslims from the CAA purview of the as a move similar to that of the pogrom against the Jews by Nazis in Germany during World War II. Gohain has been a strong critic of Narendra Modi.

Gohain participated in an anti-CAA protest organised by the All Assam Journalists Union in front of Guwahati Press Club.

References

1939 births
Living people
People from Golaghat
Assamese-language poets
Poets from Assam
20th-century Indian poets
Recipients of the Sahitya Akademi Award in Assamese